The University of Klagenfurt ( or Alpen-Adria-Universität Klagenfurt, AAU) is a federal Austrian research university and the largest research and higher education institution in the state of Carinthia. It has its campus in Klagenfurt.

Originally founded in 1970 and relaunched in 1993, the university today holds faculties of arts, humanities & education, management, economics & law, social sciences, and technical sciences. It is listed in the ARWU, THE, and QS global rankings and held rank 48 worldwide in THE's Young University Rankings 2021.

The university has defined three research priority areas, Social Ecology (until 2018, transferred to BOKU Vienna), Networked and Autonomous Systems, and Multiple Perspectives in Optimization, with the former spawning three ERC Grants and the latter a doc.funds programme of the Austrian Science Fund. It has launched a new initiative, Humans in the Digital Age (HDA), in 2019, hosting an ERC Grant on cybersecurity.

It also holds a number of central facilities such as the Robert Musil Institute (co-organizer of the Bachmann Prize), the Karl Popper Kolleg (an Institute for Advanced Study), the University Cultural Centre (UNIKUM), the build! Gründerzentrum (a start-up facilitation center), the University Sports Centre (USI), and the Klagenfurt University Library.

Oliver Vitouch, a cognitive psychologist and former faculty member of the University of Vienna and the Max Planck Institute for Human Development in Berlin, is the university's Vice-Chancellor. Martin Hitz chairs the Academic Senate; Werner Wutscher, former Secretary General of the European Forum Alpbach, is chairman of the University Council.

The University of Klagenfurt is situated 30 km from the Slovenian and 60 km from the Italian border and supports bi- and multilingualism, especially in the context of the Slovenian minority in Carinthia. Together with the Free University of Bozen-Bolzano (Italy) and the University of Fribourg (Switzerland), it is among the three southernmost universities in the German-speaking world.

History

With the Protestant collegium sapientiae et pietatis founded in 1552, Klagenfurt hosted one of the oldest gymnasiums in Austria (today's Europagymnasium), directed by Hieronymus Megiser from 1593 to 1601, but had no ancient university tradition.

In 1970, the Austrian parliament passed a federal law allowing the establishment of an Educational Science College in Klagenfurt. The first doctoral degree was conferred in 1972. In 1975, new laws on higher education came into force, with the name of the college being changed into Universität für Bildungswissenschaften (University of Educational Sciences).

In 1993, a fundamental relaunch took place: The institution's name was changed to Universität Klagenfurt (University of Klagenfurt), and a Faculty of Humanities and a (new) Faculty of Economics, Business Administration, and Informatics were inaugurated. The Faculty of Interdisciplinary Studies was inaugurated in 2004.

The university adopted the official cognomen Alpen-Adria-Universität Klagenfurt in 2004 (with its legal name still being Universität Klagenfurt). It was extended with a fourth, technical sciences faculty in 2007 (with a focus on Informatics, Information Technology, and Networked & Autonomous Systems), engaging in research operations in collaboration with the Lakeside Science & Technology Park. In 2012, the number of students passed the 10,000 mark.

On occasion of the institution's 40th anniversary, a Boat Race was held on Lake Wörth in 2010. Klagenfurt's Eight won against the University of Vienna by a boat length on a sprinting distance from the rowing clubs to Maria Loretto castle.

In 2015, the university established commencement speeches at its graduation ceremonies. Among the speakers so far are Sabine Herlitschka, Josef Winkler, August-Wilhelm Scheer, Johanna Rachinger, and Josef Aschbacher. Presidents of Austria Heinz Fischer (formerly) and Alexander Van der Bellen (incumbent) are recurrent guests at doctoral graduations sub auspiciis Praesidentis.

In 2020, the university celebrated its institutional 50 year jubilee. This included a lecture series together with the Austrian Academy of Sciences, Utopia! Is the world out of joint? Contributions to the art of Enlightenment opened by Barbara Stollberg-Rilinger and the bestowal of an honorary doctorate to Rae Langton. Several further jubilee events were virtualized or postponed due to the COVID-19 pandemic. On 22 November 2020 the Austrian Broadcasting Corporation showed the TV documentary Humans in the Digital Age: University of Klagenfurt—50th Anniversary.

The jubilee exhibition ARTEFICIA was postponed to autumn 2021. It shows unique exhibits from honorary doctors Manfred Bockelmann, Michael Guttenbrunner, Maja Haderlap, Peter Handke, Maria Lassnig, Valentin Oman, Wolfgang Puschnig, Peter Turrini, and Josef Winkler.

Technological developments of the University of Klagenfurt—leading contributions to the navigation system of the robotic helicopter Ingenuity—are part of NASAs Mars 2020 mission (Mars landing on 18 February 2021, maiden flight of the helicopter on 19 April 2021).

Campus
With its suburban setting, the university campus is in walking distance of both the renaissance-dominated historic city centre of Klagenfurt (capital of the state of Carinthia) and the east bay of the Wörthersee, a renowned Austrian summer resort. Also hiking, climbing and skiing possibilities in the Austrian Alps are nearby. 

Together with the adjacent Lakeside Science & Technology Park, a 60 acres start-up and spin-off park, the university campus forms the so-called Lakeside District. The Park hosts companies such as ASFINAG, CISC Semiconductor, Dynatrace, Fraunhofer Austria, Infineon, Joanneum Research, Kapsch TrafficCom, PharmTElligent, and SKIDATA.

From 2016 to 2018, the university's central and north wing (13,000 m2) were fully refurbished with a budget of €26 million. As a result, the university was shortlisted for the Prix Versailles – Campuses 2019 (under UNESCO patronage), together with buildings of the University of Chicago in Hongkong, Barnard College, Stanford University, SPA Vijayawada, and Skoltech, which won the competition.

Faculties and departments
The following four-faculty structure does apply since 1 January 2023.

Faculty of Arts, Humanities & Education
The Faculty of Arts, Humanities & Education encompasses 11 departments and a faculty centre. Their common ambition is to foster multilingualism and intercultural education, with a special focus on teacher education.

 Department of English and American Studies
 Department of Cultural Analysis
 Department of Educational Sciences and Research
 Department of German Studies
 Department of History
 Department of Instructional and School Development
 Department of Philosophy
 Department of Romance Studies
 Department of Slavonic Studies
 Department of Sports Science
 Robert Musil Institute for Literary Studies
 Faculty Centre for Sign Language and Communication of the Hearing Impaired

Faculty of Management, Economics & Law
The Faculty of Management, Economics & Law has a focus on business management while fostering interdisciplinary links with law and economics. Alumni shall be fit for global business careers in the 21st century. Since February 2023, the Faculty is AACSB accredited.  

 Department of Business Management
 Department of Economics
 Department of Financial Management
 Department of Innovation Management and Entrepreneurship
 Department of Operations, Energy, and Environmental Management
 Department of Organization, Human Resources, and Service Management
 Department of Public, Nonprofit, and Health Management
 Department of Law

Faculty of Social Sciences
This faculty unites some core disciplines of the Social Sciences, including two of the university's most demanded curricula. Unifying element is the question of good human lives both now and in the future. The faculty maintains a strategic partnership with the Austrian Academy of Sciences.

 Department of Geography and Regional Studies
 Department of Media and Communications Science
 Department of Psychology
 Department of Science and Technology Studies
 Department of Science Communication and Higher Education Research
 Department of Sociology

Faculty of Technical Sciences
The Faculty of Technical Sciences is dedicated to research and training in the fields of informatics, information technology and technical mathematics. The faculty was founded in January 2007 and superseded the Faculty of Economics, Business Administration and Informatics as well as a newly established Department for information and communication technology. It is organized into nine departments and offers five bachelor's degree programs, four master's degree programs, two teacher training degree programs and two doctoral programs.

 Department of Artificial Intelligence and Cybersecurity
 Department of Informatics Education
 Department of Informatics Systems
 Department of Information Technology
 Department of Mathematics
 Department of Mathematics Education
 Department of Networked and Embedded Systems
 Department of Smart Systems Technologies
 Department of Statistics

The research cluster "self-organizing networked systems" closely collaborates with the research institute Lakeside Labs.

University centres
 Centre for Women's and Gender Studies
 Digital Age Research Centre (D!ARC)
 Karl Popper Kolleg
 M/O/T – School of Management, Organizational Development and Technology
 School of Education (SoE)
 UNIKUM (University Cultural Centre)

Partnerships
As of 2021, the University of Klagenfurt has strategic partnerships with the Austrian Academy of Sciences, the Ca' Foscari University of Venice, the Fraunhofer Austria Society, and with Silicon Austria Labs (SAL). It offers joint study programs with the Universities of Vienna, Graz, Udine, La Rochelle, and the Poznań University of Technology. 

Student mobility partnerships via Erasmus+ and other exchange programs exist with over 250 universities in more than 50 countries worldwide.

At the beginning of 2022, the University of Klagenfurt joined YERUN, a European network of young research-intensive universities headquartered in Brussels.

Rankings

The THE World University Rankings 2022 list the University of Klagenfurt in the 351–400 group. This is the 2nd best rank of an Austrian university with a broader spectrum of studies, second only to the University of Vienna (124) and the Medical Universities of Vienna, Graz, and Innsbruck and on par with the University of Innsbruck and the Vienna University of Technology. THE uses the field-weighted citation impact, considering the different range of fields between universities. In the THE Young University Rankings 2022, Klagenfurt holds rank 77 worldwide.

From the STEM fields, the University of Klagenfurt has technology, engineering, and mathematics in its spectrum, but not any classic sciences or life sciences, which is a handicap in the other large global university rankings. Still, it holds rank 486 in the QS World University Rankings, which aim to rank the 1,400 best universities in the world (out of > 26,000), ahead of the University of Graz (651–700) and the University of Salzburg (751–800).

The University of Klagenfurt also ranks in the Academic Ranking of World Universities (Shanghai Ranking) since 2019 (901–1,000), and in U-Multirank since 2017 (honorable mention in 2021).

At the Global Student Satisfaction Awards 2021, provided by Studyportals, the University of Klagenfurt came off as global winner for the best COVID-19 Crisis Management.

Honorary doctors

 Hans Albert (2007)
 Manfred Bockelmann (2013)
 Joseph Buttinger (1977)
 Karl Corino (2014)
 Peter Eichhorn (2003)
 Helmut Engelbrecht (1998)
 Hertha Firnberg (1980)
 Adolf Frisé (1982)
 Gerda Fröhlich (1995)
 Manfred Max Gehring (1992)
 Ernst von Glasersfeld (1997)
 Georg Gottlob (2016)
 Michael Guttenbrunner (1994)
 Maja Haderlap (2012)
 Peter Handke (2002)
 Adolf Holl (2000)
 Johannes Huber (2017)
 Sigmund Kripp (1998)
 Rae Langton (2020)
 Maria Lassnig (1999 / 2013)
 Florjan Lipuš (2022)
 Claudio Magris (1995)
 Käte Meyer-Drawe (2022)
 Ewald Nowotny (2008)
 Valentin Oman (1995)
 Paul Parin (1995)
 Wolfgang Petritsch (2013)
 Theodor Piffl-Perčević (1977)
 Janko Pleterski (2005)
 Wolfgang Puschnig (2004)
 Josef Rattner (2006)
 Siegfried J. Schmidt (2004)
 Carola-Bibiane Schönlieb (2022)
 Franz Schuh (2022)
 Klaus Tschira (1995)
 Peter Turrini (2010)
 Oswald Wiener (1995)
 Horst Wildemann (2003)
 Josef Winkler (2009)

References

External links

 
Universities and colleges in Austria
Educational institutions established in 1970
Buildings and structures in Carinthia (state)
Education in Carinthia (state)
1970 establishments in Austria